My Dog Stupid is a 2019 French comedy film directed by Yvan Attal and starring Attal and Charlotte Gainsbourg. The screenplay, written by Attal, Dean Craig and Yaël Langmann, is based on the short story of the same name from John Fante's novella West of Rome, published posthumously in 1986.

The film premiered at the 2019 Festival du Film Francophone d'Angoulême and was released in France by StudioCanal on 30 October 2019.

Cast
 Yvan Attal as Henri Mohen
 Charlotte Gainsbourg as Cécile Mohen 
 Ben Attal as Raphaël Mohen 
 Adèle Wismes as Pauline Mohen
 Pablo Venzal as Noé Mohen
 Panayotis Pascot as Gaspard Mohen
 Éric Ruf as Professor Fréderic Mazard

References

External links
 

2019 films
2019 comedy films
2010s French films
2010s French-language films
Films about dogs
Films about writers
Films based on American short stories
Films based on works by John Fante
Films directed by Yvan Attal
French comedy films
StudioCanal films